The Magic Johnson Award is an annual award for a National Basketball Association (NBA) player who recognizes excellence on the court and cooperation and dignity with the media and public.

The award, which was created in 2001 by the Pro Basketball Writers Association a professional nonprofit organization comprised approximately 175 writers and editors of people who regularly cover the NBA for newspapers, magazines and websites has been given to some of the league's most prominent players over the years. It is named in honor of player Magic Johnson, whom the writers association regards as "the ideal model" for this award.

Ray Allen was the first NBA player to win this achievement. In the current year of 2020, Damian Lillard was named the winner.

Winners

See also

References 

National Basketball Association awards
National Basketball Association lists
Awards established in 2001